Johnnie Dady is a South Australian artist and arts educator who specialises in installation art entailing sculpture and drawing.

Biography 
Johnnie Dady (also known as Johnny Dady and Jonathan Dady) was born in the UK in 1961 and migrated to Australia in 1987.  He has a BA (Hons), Fine Art Sculpture, from Maidstone College in the United Kingdom and a Master of Visual Arts from the University of South Australia.  He lectures in drawing and sculpture at Adelaide Central School of Art.

In 2013, his sculpture, The Fones at the University of Adelaide was vandalised.

He has also collaborated with fellow artist and lecturer Roy Ananda.

Artistic style and subject 
Dady is known for his installation pieces such as cardboard pianos.  He is also known for large-scale drawings.

Residencies 
 Australia Council London studio residency 2001 
 Australia Council Rome studio residency 2006 
 Australia Council London Studio Residency 2009

Major exhibitions 
 2012 Heysen Sculpture Biennial

Collections 
Dady's work is held in the following collections:

 Marion City Council
 University of Adelaide

Further reading 
 Baseless propositions, exhibition catalogue, 2009
 Drawing/sculpture Johnnie Dady (AUS), exhibition catalogue, 2007 
 Heartlines exhibition catalogue 2010
 Johnnie Dady and Roy Ananda, Wax on, Wax off: Exercises in thinking and action, 2015

References

External links 
 Entry in Design & Art Australia Online

Living people
1961 births
Artists from South Australia
Australian contemporary artists
Artists from Adelaide
20th-century Australian artists
21st-century Australian artists
Australian art teachers